The 2014 FIA World Touring Car Championship was a motor racing competition organised by the Fédération Internationale de l'Automobile (FIA) for Super 2000 Cars. It was the eleventh FIA World Touring Car Championship, and the tenth since the series was revived in 2005.

After making a race-winning début on home soil during the 2013 campaign, Argentina's José María López won the drivers' championship after performing strongest during the season. Driving for the Citroën team, López won ten races during the season, significantly more than team-mates Yvan Muller – the defending series champion – and Sébastien Loeb, who was in his first season in the championship. López finished all but one race during the season, with his only retirement coming during the second race in Russia, and finished the season 126 points clear of his next closest challenger, which was Muller. Muller took four victories during the season, all coming from pole position. Loeb finished a further 41 points behind Muller, taking a pair of victories, in Morocco and the only race in Slovakia.

Only one other driver won more than one race, as Robert Huff won the first races for Lada Sport in the World Touring Car Championship. Huff won the second races in Beijing and Macau; his win in the latter was his seventh at the circuit, over the previous seven years. Single race winners during 2014 were Gabriele Tarquini (Japan), Tom Chilton (Beijing), Gianni Morbidelli (Hungary), Mehdi Bennani (Shanghai) and Ma Qing Hua in Russia. Morbidelli's win was his first in the series, while the victories for Bennani and Ma were the first in FIA competition for their respective countries, Morocco and China.

Citroën dominated the manufacturers' championship, taking a total of 17 overall wins out of the 23 races. The marque finished almost 300 points clear of Honda, who finished in second position. In the TC2-only Yokohama Drivers' Trophy, Franz Engstler finished well clear of the field in his final WTCC season before moving to the TCR International Series. Engstler achieved 20 victories and a pair of second places from 23 starts, and finished 90 points clear of closest rival John Filippi, who won the second race in Japan. The other race winners were Pasquale Di Sabatino in Hungary, and ETCC regular Petr Fulín, who won the race in Slovakia. In the Yokohama Teams' Trophy for non-manufacturer teams, ROAL Motorsport, with Chilton and Tom Coronel as its drivers, finished 91 points clear of the single-car team of Zengő Motorsport and driver Norbert Michelisz. The Yokohama Performer of the Year award went to López, taking the most fastest laps of the season, with eleven.

Teams and drivers

For the 2014 season, the series' technical regulations were altered. Cars built to the 2014 specifications were classified as "TC1", whilst cars built prior to 2014 were classified as "TC2".

Team changes
 French car manufacturer Citroën entered the championship in 2014, with a works team, competing with the Citroën C-Elysée model. The team entered three cars for the full season, and added an additional entry for Ma Qing Hua in five rounds of the championship.
 Honda expanded to become a four-car operation, with two cars entered by the works Honda World Touring Car Team. Two additional cars were supplied to Proteam Racing and Zengő Motorsport with each team running one car.
 Lada Sport expanded to run three cars.
 In September 2013, SEAT announced that they would not return to the WTCC in 2014 in order to focus on the revived SEAT León Eurocup. Some private entries used old-specification SEAT cars in the TC2 class.
 Münnich Motorsport had originally intended to enter one car for team owner René Münnich in selected races in the TC2 class, but later elected to remain in TC1, competing with two 2014-specification Chevrolet Cruzes.
 The RML Group shifted its focus in 2014, withdrawing their team in order to become a constructor and supply 2014-specification Chevrolet Cruzes to customer teams.
 Campos Racing and ROAL Motorsport ran RML built TC1-specification Chevrolet Cruzes. Each team fielded two TC1 cars, while Campos Racing also fielded one full-time and two part-time TC2-specification SEAT León WTCC cars.
 Bamboo Engineering left the series to run a single Aston Martin V8 Vantage in the World Endurance Championship.
 NIKA Racing switched to a TC2-specification Honda Civic WTCC for the 2014 season after racing with a Chevrolet Cruze 1.6T for the last two seasons.

Driver changes
 Robert Huff left the Münnich Motorsport team to join Lada Sport.
 Nine-time World Rally Champion Sébastien Loeb entered the championship with Citroën Total WTCC.
 José María López joined Citroën for a full-season campaign after making his World Touring Car Championship debut at his home race in Argentina during the 2013 season.
 Yvan Muller left RML after four years with the team, joining Citroën's campaign alongside Loeb.
 Dušan Borković entered the series with a Chevrolet Cruze alongside Hugo Valente at Campos Racing in the TC1 class.
 Tom Chilton left RML and moved to ROAL Motorsport alongside Tom Coronel.
 Stefano D'Aste and Fredy Barth did not compete in the series, in the 2014 season.
 Darryl O'Young and Alex MacDowall left the series to compete for Bamboo Engineering in the World Endurance Championship.
 James Nash and Marc Basseng left the series to join Belgian Audi Club Team WRT in the Blancpain Endurance Series and Blancpain Sprint Series respectively.
 Ma Qing Hua entered the series, driving the fourth Citroën car at five meetings.
 John Filippi entered the series, driving for Campos Racing in a SEAT León in the TC2 class.
 Yukinori Taniguchi returned to the series for 2014, driving for NIKA Racing.

Regulation changes
The sporting and technical regulations were approved by the FIA, at the July 2013 meeting of the World Motor Sport Council:

Sporting regulations
 Qualifying was held in three parts, with the top five going into Q3.
 The balance of performance—introducing various waivers and differentiated base weights of the cars to equalise the field— but compensation weights were used once again.

Technical regulations
The series introduced a raft of changes to the technical regulations for the 2014 season. The cars were still built to Super 2000 regulations, but with significant changes compared to the 2011 generation of cars. The size of the wheels being used increased to 18", with MacPherson strut suspension being introduced to all cars. Changes to the aerodynamic package allowed teams to use flat floors, and introduce single-plane rear wings that were allowed, but to be no higher than the roof of the car.

Calendar
The provisional 2014 schedule was announced on 4 November 2013. The season was once again contested over twenty-four races at twelve circuits.

Calendar changes 

 The Race of Italy at the Autodromo Nazionale Monza and the Race of Portugal at the Circuito da Boavista were removed from the schedule. They were replaced by Race of France and Race of Belgium. The Race of France was held at the Circuit Paul Ricard using a modified layout of the Grand Prix circuit used by Formula One between 1986 and 1990. The Race of Belgium was held at the Circuit de Spa-Francorchamps with the circuit making its return on the calendar after last appearing in 2005.
 On 4 January, the FIA announced that the full Grand Prix circuit at Suzuka would be utilised, for the Race of Japan having previously used the East circuit.
 On 22 January it was announced that the opening round at the Circuit International Automobile Moulay El Hassan would be delayed by one week from 6 to 13 April.
 On 2 June it was announced that the Race of the United States would be discontinued due to logistical issues, and was replaced by an additional round in China held at the Goldenport Park Circuit.

Results and standings

Races

Compensation weights
The most competitive cars keep a 60 kg compensation weight. The other cars get a lower one, calculated according to their results for the three previous rounds. The less the cars get some good results, the less they get a compensation weight, from 0 kg to 60 kg. The compensation weights were introduced starting from the third round.

During the whole season, the Citroën C-Elysée was the reference car with the best races results and so was handicapped by a 60 kg compensation weight to limit its performances, as well as during the qualifications than during the races.

Results

Championship standings

Drivers' Championship

† – Drivers did not finish the race, but were classified as they completed over 75% of the race distance.

Manufacturers' Championship

Yokohama Trophies
World Touring Car Championship promoter Eurosport Events organised the Yokohama Drivers' Trophy and the Yokohama Teams' Trophy within the 2014 FIA World Touring Car Championship.

Yokohama Drivers' Trophy
All TC2 entries were eligible for the Yokohama Drivers' Trophy.

Yokohama Teams' Trophy
All non-manufacturer teams were eligible to score points towards the Yokohama Teams' Trophy.

† – Drivers did not finish the race, but were classified as they completed over 75% of the race distance.

Yokohama Performer of the year

Eurosport Asia Trophy

Footnotes

References

External links